Palmetto Compress and Warehouse Company Building is a historic cotton bale compress facility and warehouse building located at Columbia, South Carolina. The first section of the four-story brick building was built in 1917. The building was doubled in size in 1923.

It was added to the National Register of Historic Places in 1985.

References

Cotton mills in the United States
Buildings and structures in Columbia, South Carolina
Industrial buildings completed in 1923
Industrial buildings and structures on the National Register of Historic Places in South Carolina
National Register of Historic Places in Columbia, South Carolina
Warehouses on the National Register of Historic Places